Optimist is the debut studio album by American singer-songwriter Finneas, released on October 15, 2021, through his record label OYOY, distributed by Interscope Records. The album was entirely produced and written by Finneas. It was preceded by the singles "What They'll Say About Us", "A Concert Six Months from Now", and "The 90s".

Critical reception

On review aggregator Metacritic, Optimist received a score of 72 out of 100 based on ten critics' reviews, indicating "generally favorable" reception.

Track listing

Personnel

Musicians
 Finneas – vocals, vocal arrangement, bass, drum programming, sound effects, synthesizer (1–6, 8–13); piano (all tracks), guitar (1–9, 12, 13)
 Isaiah Gage – cello (1)
 Johan Lenox – string arrangement (1)
 Yasmeen Al-Mazeedi – violin (1)

Technical
 Finneas – production
 Dave Kutch – mastering
 Rob Kinelski – mixing
 Justin Gammella – vocal editing (1–6, 8–10, 13)
 Casey Cuayo – mixing assistance
 Eli Heisler – mixing assistance

Charts

References

2021 debut albums
Albums produced by Finneas O'Connell
Finneas O'Connell albums